A Mother's Right: The Elizabeth Morgan Story is a 1992 television film directed by Linda Otto. Starring Bonnie Bedelia in the title role, the courtroom drama—which has also been released as Shattered Silence—chronicles the story behind the Elizabeth Morgan case, in which a woman suspected her ex-husband was sexually abusing their three year old daughter. After Morgan's ex-husband was cleared of suspicion by police, and a judge ordered unsupervised visitation rights be returned to him, Morgan refused to reveal the location of the child. Morgan was subsequently held in contempt of court and imprisoned for more than two years, until an act of congress was written and passed specifically to free her.

Cast
 Bonnie Bedelia as Dr. Jean Elizabeth Morgan
 Terence Knox as Eric Foretich
 Kenneth Welsh as Paul Michel
 Nick Searcy as Rob Morgan
 Pam Grier as Linda Holman
 Caroline Dollar as Hilary A. Foretich
 Patricia Neal as Antonia Morgan
 Rip Torn as Bill Morgan

Production
The film went into production under the title With Reason to Suspect on February 24, 1992, in Charlotte, North Carolina. Including preparation, director Linda Otto spent three years making the film.

Reception
Variety magazine wrote that A Mother's Right is "a quality telefilm that should draw good ratings thanks to a powerful performance by Bonnie Bedelia. [..] The telefilm provides an emotional rollercoaster ride for viewers, who will not want to get off until the last judge's gavel is pounded. Technically the project is first rate. Writing is tight and moves the project along smoothly. Drama draws on the heart strings without becoming overly sweet. Linda Otto's direction is fluid and the acting brings this project home."

References

External links

1992 television films
1992 films
1992 drama films
American courtroom films
American television films
American films based on actual events
ABC Motion Pictures films
1990s English-language films
1990s American films